Kalamiaris palm forest or Panayouda palm forest (Kalamiaris is the northern area of Panayouda settlement) is a semi-natural small palm forest on the east coast of Lesbos island.

The original twenty-four Canary Island Date Palms (Phoenix canariensis) were planted by the English diplomat Atkinson who brought them from Egypt in the late 19th century. Later when those palms were starting to produce seeds, new palms born around, so that today we can speak for a small but dense palm forest, which at 80% of its palm population is natural and totally (artificial and natural way vegetation) has about 150-155 phoenix canariensis palm trees.
The forest continues to propagate new seed palms yet, but it has not been protected by the local authority. These seed palms are food for some local vegetarian animals or being stolen, so the forest spreads out very slowly.

Text resources
 A small reference at the Greek net site
 A small reference for the palm forest surrounding protection at the Greek net site
Translated from the article at Greek Wikipedia.

Forests of Greece
Lesbos
Palmetum